Liverpool Regional High School (LRHS) is a secondary school located in Liverpool, Nova Scotia, Canada. LRHS is part of the South Shore Regional School Board and is the only high school in the town of Liverpool, Nova Scotia.

External links
Liverpool Regional High School
South Shore Regional School Board

History 

 Liverpool Regional High School was opened in 1990

High schools in Nova Scotia
Schools in the Region of Queens Municipality, Nova Scotia